Robert Honiwood LL.D. (d. 22 January 1523) was a Canon of Windsor from 1504 to 1523

Career

He was appointed:
Archdeacon of Norwich 1497
Chancellor of Norwich 1499
Archdeacon of Taunton 1509
Prebendary of Lichfield 1512

He was appointed to the second stall in St George's Chapel, Windsor Castle in 1504, and held the stall until 1523.

Notes 

1523 deaths
Canons of Windsor
Archdeacons of Taunton
Archdeacons of Norfolk
Year of birth missing